"Nobody Knows" is a song by R&B singer Tony Rich (then known as the Tony Rich Project) from his 1996 debut album, Words. Released as his debut single on November 7, 1995, the song peaked at number two on both the Billboard Hot 100 and Billboard Hot Adult Contemporary Tracks charts. It also became a hit in several other countries, topping the Irish Singles Chart and reaching number two in Australia and Canada, number four in the United Kingdom, and the top 20 in the Netherlands, New Zealand, and Sweden. Rich received a nomination for the 1997 Grammy Award for Best Male Pop Vocal Performance.

Critical reception
James Hamilton from Music Weeks RM Dance Update described the song as a "mushily harmonised US smash crossover smoocher melodically reminiscent of Chairmen Of The Board's 'Patches'".

Track listingsUS CD single "Nobody Knows" (album version) – 5:06
 "Nobody Knows" (Eddie F.'s Untouchable remix) – 6:17
 "Nobody Knows" (Rich remix) – 5:32
 "Nobody Knows" (album instrumental) – 5:06US cassette single "Nobody Knows" (radio edit)
 "Nobody Knows" (album instrumental)European CD single "Nobody Knows" (album version) – 5:20
 "Nobody Knows" (album instrumental) – 5:20UK and Australian CD single "Nobody Knows" (radio edit) – 4:22
 "Nobody Knows" (Rich single edit) – 4:22
 "Nobody Knows" (Untouchable Flava edit) – 4:21
 "Nobody Knows" (album version) – 5:06UK cassette single "Nobody Knows" (radio edit)
 "Nobody Knows" (Rich single edit)

Credits and personnel
Credits are taken from the US CD single liner notes.Studios Recorded at Studio LaCoCo (Atlanta, Georgia, US)
 Mixed and mastered at The Hit Factory  (New York City)Personnel'''

 Joe Rich – writing
 Don DuBose – writing
 Tony Rich – vocals, all instruments except acoustic guitar, production, arrangement
 Peter Moore – acoustic guitar
 Neal H Pogue – recording
 John Frye – recording assistant
 Jon Gass – mixing
 Danny Berniny – mixing assistant
 Herb Powers – mastering

 Antonio M. Reid – executive producer
 Edward "Eddie F." Ferrell – A&R
 Sharon A. Daley – A&R coordination
 Davett Singletary – creative direction
 Angela Skouras – art direction
 Daniel Soder – photography
 Derick Procope – stylist
 Barry White – hair stylist and make-up

Charts

Weekly charts

Year-end charts

Decade-end charts

All-time charts

Certifications

Release history

Kevin Sharp version

American country music artist Kevin Sharp recorded a cover version of the song on his 1996 debut album, Measure of a Man. It was released in September 1996 as his debut single. It became his only number-one single on the Billboard Hot Country Singles & Tracks chart, spending four weeks on the chart.

Critical reception
Deborah Evans Price of Billboard magazine reviewed the song favorably, saying that his "smooth, melodic voice and sensitive interpretation of the lyric signal show promise for this talented new artist."

Music video
The music video was directed by Jeffrey Phillips and premiered in late 1996.

Charts
Weekly charts

Year-end charts

Other versions
In 1997, saxophonist Richard Elliot covered the song from his album "Jumpin' Off." Eli Mattson delivered a piano/vocal cover on the third season of America's Got Talent in 2008. British boyband JLS also recorded a cover of the song; it was leaked onto the internet in June 2010 and has now appeared as the B-Side to their single She Makes Me Wanna''. British pop singer Shayne Ward included a cover on his third album, Obsession.
The song is featured on the Boyzone album, BZ20, released in November 2013.

References

1995 debut singles
1995 songs
1996 debut singles
Arista Records singles
Asylum Records singles
Contemporary R&B ballads
Kevin Sharp songs
Irish Singles Chart number-one singles
LaFace Records singles
Music videos directed by Bille Woodruff
Song recordings produced by Chris Farren (country musician)
Songs about loneliness
Tony Rich songs